The 2013–14 Iowa Hawkeyes men's basketball team represented the University of Iowa in the 2013–14 college basketball season. The team was led by fourth year head coach Fran McCaffery and played their home games at Carver-Hawkeye Arena. They were members of the Big Ten Conference. They finished the season 20–13, 9–9 in Big Ten play to finish in sixth place. They lost in the first round of the Big Ten tournament to Northwestern. They received an invitation to the NCAA Tournament where they lost Tennessee in the first four.

Last season
The team finished the previous season with a record of 25-13, 9-9 in Big Ten play and finished 6th in the Big Ten. The 25 wins was the most wins in one season for the Hawkeyes since the 2005-2006 season, in which Iowa also had 25 wins. The team was invited to the 2013 National Invitation Tournament as a 3rd seed in the Virginia Bracket. The team advanced to the NIT Championship game but lost to Baylor. The Hawkeyes received 7 votes in the final USA Today Coaches Poll, making it the first time that Iowa had received votes in the coaches poll since 2006.

Roster
The 2013-14 Iowa Hawkeyes squad contained 15 players which included 1 freshman, 1 redshirt freshman, 4 sophomores, 6 juniors, and 3 seniors.

2013 Commitments

Schedule and results

|-
!colspan=9 style="background:#000000; color:#FFCC00;"| Exhibition

|-
!colspan=9 style="background:#000000; color:#FFCC00;"| Non-conference regular season

|-
!colspan=9 style="background:#000000; color:#FFCC00;"| Big Ten regular season

|-
!colspan=9 style="background:#000000; color:#FFCC00;"| Big Ten tournament

|-
!colspan=9 style="background:#000000; color:#FFCC00;"| NCAA tournament

^ This game was originally scheduled for February 18, but was postponed due to safety concerns following a piece of metal falling from the roof at Assembly Hall. 
Source: Schedule

Rankings

References

Iowa
Iowa Hawkeyes men's basketball seasons
Iowa
Hawk
Hawk